Edward Lucas (born 3 May 1962) is a British writer and security specialist.

Career

Lucas is non-resident Senior Fellow at the Center for European Policy Analysis. Until 2018, he was a senior editor at The Economist. He writes a column for The Times and occasionally writes for the Daily Mail. He edited Standpoint magazine from September 2019 until March 2020. Lucas has covered Central and Eastern European affairs since 1986, writing, broadcasting, and speaking on the politics, economics, and security of the region.

In September 2021, he was selected as the Liberal Democrat prospective parliamentary candidate for the constituency of Cities of London and Westminster in the next general election, then expected to take place in 2024.

Personal life
Lucas's second wife is the columnist Cristina Odone, with whom he has one child; he had two children with his first wife Claudia, who is German. He lives in London. His father was the Oxford philosopher John Lucas.

On 1 December 2014, he became the first e-resident of Estonia.

Bibliography
 The New Cold War: Putin's Russia and the Threat to the West , Palgrave Macmillan (19 February 2008), .
 Deception: The Untold Story of East-West Espionage Today, Walker & Company (19 June 2012), 
The Snowden Operation: Inside the West's Greatest Intelligence Disaster, Amazon Publishing (23 January 2014), ASIN: B00I0W61OY
Cyberphobia: Identity, Trust, Security and the Internet, Bloomsbury (5 May 2015), 
Spycraft Rebooted: How Technology is Changing Espionage, Amazon Publishing (6 March 2018), ASIN: B078W6LXGG

References

External links
 Edward Lucas's site

1962 births
Living people
Alumni of the London School of Economics
British male journalists
The Economist people
Daily Mail journalists
English Anglicans
People educated at Winchester College
Jagiellonian University alumni
20th-century British journalists
21st-century British journalists